Highway 156 (AR 156, Ark. 156, Hwy. 156, and Gulley Road) is a former state highway in Washington County, Arkansas. Between 1973 and 1981, the highway was maintained by the Arkansas State Highway and Transportation Department (AHTD), now known as the Arkansas Department of Transportation (ArDOT).

Route description
The highway began at Old Wire Road in eastern Washington County between Fayetteville and Springdale. AR 156 wound south and east through a rural area of the Ozark Mountains to AR 45, where it terminated.

History
In 1973, the Arkansas General Assembly passed Act 9 of 1973. The act directed county judges and legislators to designate up to 12 miles (19 km) of county roads as state highways in each county. Highway 156 was designated along Gulley Road in Washington County in accordance with the act by the Arkansas State Highway Commission on June 28, 1973. It was deleted at the request of the Washington County Judge in exchange for designation of a county road as Highway 74 near Brentwood.

Major intersections

See also

References

156
Transportation in Washington County, Arkansas